Camps-sur-l'Agly (Languedocien: Camps d’Aglin) is a commune in the Aude department in southern France.

Population

See also
 Pic de Bugarach
 Communes of the Aude department

References

Communes of Aude
Aude communes articles needing translation from French Wikipedia